Shenington Gliding Club is a British gliding club near the village of Shenington in the Cotswolds, seven miles north west of Banbury.  The club changed its name to Edgehill Gliding Centre in 2022, but still operates from Shenington Airfield.

The present club was founded in 1991, though gliding had been a regular activity at the airfield since 1984. The club operates every day of the week and currently has two K13, a K21, a K8, a motor glider, two lpg powered winches and a tug.  There are numerous privately owned gliders.

The club hosts trial lessons for visitors and runs courses with professional instructors from March to October.

RAF Edgehill
The airfield was completed in 1941, and called RAF Edgehill. 

No. 21 Operational Training Unit (OTU) was based at the airfield operating Vickers Wellingtons, Miles Martinets and Hawker Hurricanes also No. 12 OTU were based at the airfield as well. No. 1 Flying Training School RAF also used Edgehill at some point.

The airfield was also used for the flight testing of the Gloster E28/39 in 1942 after it had made its maiden flights at RAF Cranwell.

After the war it became a storage depot. After a brief period as a Flying Training School, it finally closed as an RAF station in 1953.

Accidents and incidents

References
The Story of RAF Edgehill, by Eric G. Kaye, The Self-Publishing Association Ltd., 1990

External links
WW II Airfields of Oxfordshire
 Shenington Gliding Club
 History of the airfield
 BBC History – The Long Wait

Gliding in England
Organisations based in Oxfordshire
Flying clubs